Stanley Chaunce David (born on February 17, 1962) is a former American football player for the Buffalo Bills of the National Football League (NFL). He was drafted in the seventh round (182nd pick overall) of the 1984 NFL Draft. David graduated from Tucumcari High School in Tucumcari, New Mexico. Collegiately, he was a safety for the Texas Tech Red Raiders. He appears as number 48 on Sports Illustrated 's list of "The 50 Greatest New Mexico Sports Figures". 

Currently, David is the city manager of Denver City, Texas.

References

1962 births
American football defensive backs
Buffalo Bills players
Living people
Texas Tech Red Raiders football players
American city managers
People from Tucumcari, New Mexico
People from North Platte, Nebraska